is a Japanese girl idol group, formed by Stardust Promotion in June 2015.

The group is based in Fukuoka Prefecture and is managed by Stardust Promotion's regional Fukuoka office.

As of 2016, it is the latest sister group of Momoiro Clover Z (based in Tokyo), Shiritsu Ebisu Chugaku (Tokyo), Team Syachihoko (Nagoya), and Tacoyaki Rainbow (Osaka).

Members

Former Members

Timeline

Discography

Singles

Albums

References

External links 
 Official website
 Batten Showjo Tai official playlist on YouTube

Japanese idol groups
Japanese girl groups
Japanese pop music groups
Child musical groups
Musical groups established in 2015
2015 establishments in Japan
Stardust Promotion artists
Musical groups from Fukuoka Prefecture
J-pop music groups